Ryōi Shintō-ryū Jūjutsu  良移心当流 柔術, (also known as Fukuno-ryū 福野流, Shintō Yawara 神当和, or Ryōi Shintō-ryū Yawara 良移心當流和) is a traditional school (Koryū 古流, old style) of Jujutsu (柔術), founded in the early 17th century by Fukuno Shichirouemon Masakatsu (福野七郎右衛門正勝).

Etymology
The 'Ryōi Shintō-ryū Denju Mokuroko' (良移心当流 伝授 目録) explains the meaning of Ryōi Shintō as follows: "The meaning of Ryōi Shintō-ryū is to shift (i 移) your heart (shin 心) well (ryō 良), then you will encounter (tō 当) harmony (wa 和, or yawara, an alternative tern for jujutsu)." Alternatively, the 'Ryōi Shintō-ryū Ryakushi' records Fukuno as saying that: "Ryōi Shintō means to: skillfully apply the mind (shin 心) and strike (tō 当) with ease."

History
Together with the Takenouchi-ryū (竹内流) and the Yōshin-ryū (楊心流), the Ryōi Shintō-ryū was one of the three largest, most important and influential Jūjutsu schools of the Edo period (江戸時代 Edo jidai 1603 - 1868) before the rise of Judo.

It's descendant styles include: the Kitō-ryū Jūjutsu (起倒流柔術), Jikishin-ryū yawara (直心流柔) and Ise Jitoku Tenshin-ryū Jūjutsu (為勢自得天眞流柔術) aka Jigō Tenshin-ryū Jūjutsu (自剛天真流 柔術). Also, through its Kitō-ryū roots, Kōdōkan Jūdō (講道館 柔道) can be seen as being partially descended from Ryōi Shintō-ryū Jūjutsu.

The 'Jigō Tenshin-ryū densho' (自剛天真流 伝書) states that:    "For grappling on the battlefield, Ryōi Shintō-ryū is unequalled."

Fukuno Shichirouemon Masakatsu
Fukuno was born (approx.) 1585 in Settsu, Naniwa (the modern-day area of Osaka, Japan) and known as in his youth as 'Yuzen'. He studied with Yagyū Munetoshi (柳生石舟斎平宗厳 1529 – May 25, 1606) of the Yagyū Shinkage-ryū (柳生新陰流) of Kenjutsu (剣術). Fukuno was a Meishu (名手 - master) of Sumo (相撲) and a Tatsujin (達人 - master expert) of the Yagyū Shinkage-ryū. Between 1626 - 1627, he also studied 'hoshu no jutsu’ (捕手の術 – hand taking) with a Chinese monk called Chin Genpin 陳元贇 (Chinese: Chén Yuánbīn 1587-1674) at the Kokushoji monastery in Azabu (麻布 in Minato, Tokyo).

The ‘Jujutsu Hottan - Fukuno Shichirouemon den” states that Fukuno:

".... was an intrepid character, with great strength, he lifted mighty bronze pots. He took pleasure in learning the techniques of Nomi no Sukune (野見 宿禰). Fukuno endured mental tortures and developed his physique, and after twenty years or so, he finally acquired mastery of Nomi no Sukune's techniques. People spoke of him admiringly. He fights with great strength and battles with great valour. With his technique, he defeats an opponent in barely a minute, or two. His determination is to fight to the death. His techniques are correct, who could deny him victory.

Meiji period

Later, in the ‘Meiji period’ (1868-1912), Ryōi Shintō-ryū Jūjutsuka – Hansuke Nakamura was considered the toughest martial artist in Japan. In 1886, Nakamura fought a match against the famed Kōdōkan Judo (講道館 柔道) champion Yokoyama Sakujiro (横山 作次郎), known as ‘Demon’ Yokoyama (鬼横山). Both men fought for 55 minutes, but as neither prevail the match was drawn. Nakamura was declared champion of East of Japan and Yokoyama champion of the West.

Ryōi Shintō-ryū Jūjutsu in the United Kingdom

Ryōi Shintō-ryū Jūjutsu 良移心当流 柔術 was brought to the UK in 1924 by Takeda Tatsu (竹田 辰), who taught a number of students, including Peter Shortt, who taught his son James Shortt. Takaeda was followed in 1957 by another Ryōi Shintō-ryū teacher; Komito Kaizō (小見戸 戒三). Komito also taught James Shortt’s and eventually awarded him 'Menkyo Kaiden' (免許皆伝 full teaching licence).

Peter King began training in Ryōi Shintō-ryū Jūjutsu with James Shortt in 1976 and was awarded Menkyo Kaiden 免許皆伝 by Shortt Sensei in 1997.

In Japan
Ryōi Shintō-ryū demonstration for Japanese Crown Prince

In 1985, James Shortt and Peter King had the honour of demonstrating Jūjutsu 柔術 for Japanese now Japanese Emperor (then, Crown Prince) Naruhito (徳仁 天皇)  at the Anjinkai Festival in London.

Ryōi Shintō-ryū Taikai in Japan

The 2009 Ryōi Shintō-ryū Taikai (良移心当流 大会) was held at the 'Budōkan' (武道館), Sanbu City, Chiba-ken, Japan. This event was taught by James Shortt Sensei and was attended by participants from Japan, Europe and Australia.

During this Taikai, Simon Bell, Osanai Hideto, & Aleksis Konoshonoks also received Menkyo Kaiden (免許 皆伝).

Ryōi Shintō-ryū Jūjutsu in contemporary Japan -

As with many Koryū Jūjutsu styles, the main Sōke (宗家) lines of the Ryōi Shintō-ryū are now believed to be lost, with only the Ise Jitoku Tenshin-ryū branch of the Ryōi Shintō, Kasahara-ryū (良移心當 笠原流) remaining in Japan under the leadership of 16th generation Sōke (宗家) Mifune Toichiro.

References

Ko-ryū bujutsu